Synodontis tessmanni  is a species of upside-down catfish endemic to Cameroon where it is only known from the Ntem River.  This species grows to a length of  TL.

References

External links 

tessmanni
Freshwater fish of Africa
Fish of Cameroon
Endemic fauna of Cameroon
Fish described in 1911